John McCullough House was a historic home located at West Pennsboro Township in Cumberland County, Pennsylvania. It was built between 1804 and 1807, and was a -story, 5-bay brick dwelling with a gable roof in a vernacular Georgian style.  It featured an unusual two-story, inset portico.  The house has been demolished.

It was listed on the National Register of Historic Places in 1978.

References 

Houses on the National Register of Historic Places in Pennsylvania
Georgian architecture in Pennsylvania
Houses completed in 1807
Houses in Cumberland County, Pennsylvania
National Register of Historic Places in Cumberland County, Pennsylvania